Creedmoor may refer to:

Places in the United States
 Creedmoor, North Carolina
 Creedmoor, Texas

Other uses
 Creedmoor Branch, Queens, New York
 6.5mm Creedmoor, a centerfire rifle cartridge
 Creedmoor Psychiatric Center, Queens, New York
 Creedmoor Rifle Range, Queens, New York

See also
 Creedmore (Mountain Lake Park, Maryland), a historic home listed on the NRHP in Maryland